This article is a list of horse and pony breeds with articles on Wikipedia, and also includes terms for types of horse that are not necessarily standardized breeds but are often labeled as breeds.  While there is no scientifically accepted definition of the term "breed", a breed is generally defined as having distinct true-breeding characteristics over a number of generations. Its members may be called "purebred".  In most cases, bloodlines of horse breeds are recorded with a breed registry. The concept is somewhat flexible in horses, as open stud books are created for recording pedigrees of horse breeds that are not yet fully true-breeding.

Registries also are considered the authority as to whether a given breed is listed as a "horse" or a "pony".  There are also a number of "color breed", sport horse, and gaited horse registries for horses with various phenotypes or other traits, which admit any animal fitting a given set of physical characteristics, even if there is little or no evidence of the trait being a true-breeding characteristic.  Other recording entities or specialty organizations may recognize horses from multiple breeds, thus, for the purposes of this article, such animals are classified as a "type" rather than a "breed".

The breeds and types listed here are those that already have a Wikipedia article. For a more extensive list, see the List of all horse breeds in DAD-IS.

For additional information, see horse breed, horse breeding, and the individual articles listed below. Additional articles may be listed under :Category:Horse breeds and :Category:Types of horse.

Horse breeds 

In some cultures and for some competition-sanctioning organizations, a horse that normally matures less than about  when fully grown may be classified as a "pony". Unless the principal breed registry or breed standard describes the breed as a pony, it is listed in this section, even if some or all representatives are small or have some pony characteristics. Ponies are listed in the  section below.

A–C

D-K

L-R

S-Z

Pony breeds 

If a breed is described as a "pony" by the breed standard or principal breed registry, it is listed in this section, even if some individuals have horse characteristics. All other breeds are listed in the  section above.

(Because of this designation by the preference of a given breed registry, most miniature horse breeds are listed as "horses", not ponies.)

A-K

L-Z

Color "breeds" 

There are some registries that accept horses (and sometimes ponies and mules) of almost any breed or type for registration.  Color is either the only criterion for registration or the primary criterion.  These are called "color breeds", because unlike "true" horse breeds, there are few other physical requirements, nor is the stud book limited in any fashion.  As a general rule, the color also does not always breed on (in some cases due to genetic impossibility), and offspring without the stated color are usually not eligible for recording with the color breed registry.  There are breeds that have color that usually breeds "true" as well as distinctive physical characteristics and a limited stud book.  These horses are true breeds that have a preferred color, not color breeds, and include the Friesian horse, the Cleveland Bay, the Appaloosa, and the American Paint Horse.

The best-known "color breed" registries that accept horses from many different breeds are for the following colors:
 Buckskin: a color which cannot breed "true" due to the cream gene which creates it being an incomplete dominant
 Palomino: a color which cannot breed "true" due to the cream gene which creates it being an incomplete dominant
 Pinto: there exists a registry for Pinto-colored horses of varying breeds, distinct from the American Paint Horse registry, though some qualifying horses may be registered in both. 
 White: some of these animals are registered in the United States with the American creme and white horse registry, which was once called an "Albino" registry until it was understood that true albino does not exist in horses.  (see White (horse) and Dominant white for details)

Types of horse 

A "type" of horse is not a breed but is used here to categorize groups of horses or horse breeds that are similar in appearance (phenotype) or use.  A type usually has no breed registry, and often encompasses several breeds. However, in some nations, particularly in Europe, there is a recording method or means of studbook selection for certain types to allow them to be licensed for breeding. Horses of a given type may be registered as one of several different recognized breeds, or a grouping may include horses that are of no particular pedigree but meet a certain standard of appearance or use.

Modern types

Archaic types 

Prior to approximately the 13th century, few pedigrees were written down, and horses were classified by physical type or use.  Thus, many terms for Horses in the Middle Ages did not refer to breeds as we know them today, but rather described appearance or purpose.  These terms included:

Charger, see Courser (horse)
Courser (horse)
Destrier or "Great Horse"
Hobby, see Irish Hobby
Jennet, sometimes called Spanish Jennet
Palfrey
Rouncey
Steppe horse, refers to various domesticated horse and wild horse species, particularly those from Siberia and other parts of western Asia

Extinct subspecies and breeds 
This section does not include any species within evolution of the horse prior to modern Equus ferus caballus.

Extinct subspecies
 Tarpan

Extinct breeds 
Many breeds of horse have become extinct, either because they have died out, or because they have been absorbed into another breed:

See also
 List of horse breeds in DAD-IS
 Lists of breeds
 Lists of horse-related topics

References 

 
Breeds
Horse